Micrantha may refer to:
 Micrantha (citrus), a wild citrus
 Micrantha (crucifer), a genus of plants in the family Brassicaceae
 Micrantha (moth), a genus of moths

See also 
 Micranthes, a genus of plants in the saxifrage family